Laugardælir  is a small settlement in southwest Iceland, near the town of Selfoss.  The town gained international attention when former 1972 World Chess Champion Bobby Fischer was buried at the Laugardælir Church in 2008.

References

See also
Bobby Fischer Center, within 300 metres of cemetery.
List of cities in Iceland

Bobby Fischer
Populated places in Iceland
Selfoss